Walt's Puffer II is an early American Altered drag racing car, built in Inkster, Michigan.

History
Walt’s Puffer II is a FIAT Topolino powered by a fuel injected 392 hemi, driven by Walt Knoch, Jr.

Construction of the car began in 1959. Using a 1939 Fiat body, it was built by Walt Knoch, Sr., and a family friend, for Walt, Jr. It originally had a Latham supercharger. It debuted at Detroit Dragway.

Knoch Jr. approached Ed Iskendarian and Stuart Hilborn for equipment to improve the 392's performance.

The car lost the Altereds title at the 1960 U.S. Nationals to the Oldsmobile-powered Ratican-Jackson-Stearns Fiat.

In 1961, the car's top was chopped, and it was dubbed Walt's Puffer II. It again lost to the Ratican-Jackson-Stearns Topolino at the 1961 Nationals.

The next year, the car won A/Altered at the NHRA U.S. Nationals, and only failed to face the Knochs' other car, the A/Roadster Walt's Puffer Too, for Junior Eliminator due to rain. When NHRA realigned divisions in 1963, it required Knoch to change the car's number to 385. He refused, and Wally Parks and Ed Eaton banned him. The car would not run again.

Walt's Puffer II was taken out of storage in 1999 and given a complete restoration by Knoch and Jerry Dotson.

In popular culture
AMT's Double Dragster model kit, a Chrysler-powered Topolino, was issued with the number 285 on the door, the number Walt's Puffer II wore.

Notes

Sources 
Genat, Robert. "1939 Fiat Coupe Altered", written 21 April 21, 2010, at  Hot Rod Magazine online (retrieved 22 May 2017)

Fiat vehicles
1950s cars
1960s cars
Drag racing cars
Rear-wheel-drive vehicles
History of Michigan